The Mississippi kite (Ictinia mississippiensis) is a small bird of prey in the family Accipitridae.  Mississippi kites have narrow, pointed wings and are graceful in flight, often appearing to float in the air.  It is common to see several circling in the same area.

Taxonomy 
The Mississippi kite was first named and described by the Scottish ornithologist Alexander Wilson in 1811, in the third volume of his American Ornithology. Wilson gave the kite the Latin binomial name of Falco mississippiensis: Falco means "falcon", while mississippiensis means from the Mississippi River in the United States. The current genus of Ictinia originated with Louis Jean Pierre Vieillot's 1816 Analyse d'une nouvelle Ornithologie Elémentaire. The genus name derives from the Greek iktinos, for "kite". Wilson also gave the Mississippi kite its English-language common name. He had first observed the species in the Mississippi Territory, while the bird's long pointed wings and forked tail suggested that it was a type of kite. It is currently classified in the subfamily Buteoninae, tribe Buteonini.

Description
Adults are gray with darker gray on their tail feathers and outer wings and lighter gray on their heads and inner wings. Kites of all ages have red eyes and red to yellow legs.  Males and females look alike, but the males are slightly paler on the head and neck.  Young kites have banded tails and streaked bodies. The bird is 12 to 15 inches (30–37 cm) beak to tail and has a wingspan averaging 3 feet (91 cm).  Weight is from 214 to 388 grams (7.6–13.7 oz).  The call is a high-pitched squeak, sounding similar to the noise made by a squeaky toy.

Range and migration 
The summer breeding territory of the Mississippi kite is in the central and southern United States; the southern Great Plains is considered a stronghold for the species. Breeding territory has expanded in recent years and Mississippi kites have been regularly recorded in the southern New England states; a pair has successfully raised young as far north as Newmarket, New Hampshire. Another pair was observed breeding in Ohio in 2007. As well, the territory has expanded westwards due to shelterbelts being planted in grassland habitats. 

This species migrate to southern subtropical South America in the winter, mostly to Argentina and Brazil. Migration normally occurs in groups of 20 to 30 birds. However, there are exceptions; mixed flocks may occur in migration, being recorded with up to 10,000 birds in one instance at Fuerte Esperanza, Argentina.

Behavior and ecology 
Mississippi kites are social birds, gathering in roosts in late summer. They do not maintain territories.

Food and feeding

The diet of the Mississippi kite consists mostly of insects which they capture in flight. They eat cicada, grasshoppers, and other crop-damaging insects, making them economically important.  They have also been known to eat small vertebrates, including birds, amphibians, reptiles, and small mammals. They will usually hunt from a low perch before chasing after prey, eating it in flight. They will fly around cattle and horses to catch insects stirred up from the grass.

Breeding
Mississippi kites are monogamous, forming breeding pairs before or soon after arriving at breeding sites. Courtship displays are rare, however individuals have been seen guarding their mate from competitors.

Mississippi kites usually lay two white eggs (rarely one or three) in twig nests that rest in a variety of deciduous trees, most commonly in elm, eastern cottonwood, hackberry, oak, and mesquite. Except in elm and cottonwood, most nests are fewer than 20 feet (6 m) above the ground, and are usually near water. Eggs are white to pale-bluish in color, and are usually about 1.5 inches (3.8 cm) long. In the past 75 years, the species has undergone changes in nesting habitat from use of forest and savanna to include shelterbelts and is now a common nester in urban area in the western south-central states.

Mississippi kites nest in colonies. Both parents incubate the eggs and care for the young.  They have one clutch a year, which takes 30 to 32 days to hatch. The young birds leave the nest another 30 to 34 days after hatching. Only about half of broods succeed. Clutches fall victim to storms and predators such as raccoons and great horned owls. Because there are fewer predators in urban areas, Mississippi kites produce more offspring in urban areas than rural. They have an average lifespan of 8 years.

Conservation
The species was in decline in the mid-1900s, but now has an increasing population and expanding range. While the Mississippi kite is not an endangered species, it is protected under the Migratory Bird Treaty Act of 1918, which protects the birds, their eggs, and their nests (occupied or empty) from being moved or tampered with without the proper permits.  This can make the bird a nuisance when it chooses to roost in populated urban spots such as golf courses or schools.  The birds protect their nests by diving at perceived threats, including humans; however, this occurs in less than 20% of nests.  Staying at least 50 yards from nests is the best way to avoid conflict with the birds.  If this is not possible, wearing a hat or waving hands in the air should prevent the bird from making contact but will not prevent the diving behavior.

References

External links

Mississippi Kite - Smithsonian Migratory Bird Center Article
Mississippi kite videos on the Internet Bird Collection

Historical material 

 "Falco Mississippiensis, Mississippi Kite"; in American Ornithology 2nd edition, volume 1 (1828) by Alexander Wilson and George Ord. Colour plate from 1st edition by A. Wilson. 
 John James Audubon.  "The Mississippi Kite", Ornithological Biography volume 2 (1834).  Illustration from Birds of America octavo edition, 1840.
 "Mississippi Kite", Thomas Nuttall, A manual of the ornithology of the United States and of Canada; volume 1, The Land Birds (1832).

Mississippi kite
Mississippi kite
Birds of the United States
Native birds of the Plains-Midwest (United States)
Mississippi kite
Taxa named by Alexander Wilson (ornithologist)